The 1910 World Allround Speed Skating Championships took place on 5 and 6 March 1910 at the ice rink Pohjoissatama in Helsinki, Finland.

Oscar Mathisen was the defending champion.
Nikolay Strunnikov had the fewest points awarded and became world champion.

Allround results 

  * = Fell
 NC = Not classified
 NF = Not finished
 NS = Not started
 DQ = Disqualified
Source: SpeedSkatingStats.com

Rules 
Four distances have to be skated:
 500m
 1500m
 5000m
 10000m

The ranking was made by award ranking points. The points were awarded to the skaters who had skated all the distances. The final ranking was then decided by ordering the skaters by lowest point totals.
 1 point for 1st place
 2 point for 2nd place
 3 point for 3rd place
 and so on

One could win the World Championships also by winning at least three of the four distances, so the ranking could be affected by this.

Silver and bronze medals were awarded.

References 

World Allround Speed Skating Championships, 1910
1910 World Allround
World Allround, 1910
International sports competitions in Helsinki
1910 in Finnish sport
March 1910 sports events
1910s in Helsinki